Görece is a village in the Menderes district of Izmir Province, Turkey. It is known for its production of eye beads.

Today, the real eye beads are produced only in Görece and Kurudere (Kemalpaşa) villages near Izmir by a handful of craftsmen, who have devoted their lives to this art. The 3000-year-old antique Mediterranean glass art lives in these eye bead furnaces with its every detail.

The roots of the very few glass masters who still practise this age-old tradition goes back to the Arab artisans, who have settled in Izmir and its towns during the decline of the Ottoman Empire by the end of 19th century. The glass art that has lost its glamour in Anatolia, combining with the eye sign, was relived. The masters who practised their arts at Araphan and Kemeraltı, districts of İzmir, were exiled due to the smoke emissions from their furnaces and fire risks to the neighbourhood.

See also
 Nazar (amulet)

References
 Görece Bead Furnaces and last bead masters of evil eyes

Villages in İzmir Province
Menderes (Cumaovası) District